FabricLive.39 is a 2008 mix album by DJ Yoda. The album was released as part of the FabricLive Mix Series.

Track listing
2 tracks mixed:
DJ Yoda - Intro - DJ Yoda
The Thunderclaps - Judgement Day (Donkey Work Re-Edit) - Ejectorseat
Violent Femmes - Blister in the Sun - Slash Records
Skibadee - Tika Toc - Ahead of the Game
Handsome Boy Modeling School - Holy Calamity (Bear Witness II) - Tommy Boy
Ice Cube - Jackin' For Beats - Priority
Ghost - It's all Love - Breakin' Bread
Jurassic 5 - Swing Set - Interscope Geffen
The Hot 8 Brass Band - Sexual Healing - Tru Thoughts
D-Nice - Crumbs on the Table - Zomba
Gang Starr - Just To Get a Rep - Virgin
2 tracks mixed:
Jean Jacques Perry - EVA - Vanguard
DJ Yoda & Herve - Bonus Beats - DJ Yoda
The Chemical Brothers - Salmon Dance - Virgin
The Coral - In the Morning - Deltasonic
2 tracks mixed:
Bell Biv Devoe - Poison - MCA
Tittsworth - Bonus Beats - Tittsworth
Run DMC - It's Tricky - Arista
2 tracks mixed:
Salt-n-Pepa - Push It - Island Def Jam
Scottie B - Bonus Beats - Scottie B
DJ Class - Tear Da Club Up - Unruly
Bonde Do Role - Marina Gasolina - Domino
2 tracks mixed:
Minnie Ripperton - Lovin' You - Capitol Records
Bamabounce - Bonus Beats
Collie Buddz - Come Around - SonyBMG
DJ Yoda ft. Sway - Chatterbox - Antidote
Adam F - Circles - EMI
DJ Zinc - Super Sharp Shooter - BMG
3 tracks mixed:
Wiley - Gangsters - Big Dada
Skream - Make Me - Tempa
DJ Yoda - Tip-Toe - Antidote
Lord Kitchener - London is the Place for Me - Honest Jons

External links
Fabric: FabricLive.39
Fabric Live Review by The Critique

Fabric (club) albums
DJ Yoda albums
2008 compilation albums